The Queen + Adam Lambert 2016 Summer Festival Tour was a summer stadium/festival tour by British rock band Queen and American singer Adam Lambert. The tour began on 20 May 2016, in Lisbon, Portugal at the Bela Vista Park and continued throughout Europe before concluding on 25 June 2016, in Padua, Italy at the Villa Contarini. Afterwards, the band toured throughout Asia, starting in Tel Aviv, Israel at the Yarkon Park on 12 September 2016, and visited the Formula One Singapore Grand Prix on 17 September 2016 at the Marina Bay Street Circuit and concluded on 30 September 2016 in Bangkok, Thailand at the Impact Arena.

Background and development 
Following the success of their last world tour, the group announced summer festival shows at Rock in Rio Lisboa, Sweden Rock Festival and Isle of Wight Festival. as well as announcing Asian shows afterwards, including a headline slot at the Formula One Singapore Grand Prix, where they will perform at the Marina Bay Street Circuit, along with other headline acts like Halsey, Imagine Dragons and Kylie Minogue.

Set lists 
{{hidden
| headercss = background: #ccccff; font-size: 100%; width: 75%;
| contentcss = text-align: left; font-size: 100%; width: 75%;
| header = Lisbon & Barcelona
| content =
"Flash (tape)"
"The Hero"
"Hammer to Fall"
"Seven Seas of Rhye"
"Stone Cold Crazy"
"Fat Bottomed Girls"
"Play the Game"
"Killer Queen"
"I Want To Break Free"
"Somebody to Love"
"Love of My Life"
"These Are the Days of Our Lives"
"Drum Battle"
"Under Pressure"
"Crazy Little Thing Called Love"
"Don't Stop Me Now"
"Another One Bites The Dust"
"I Want It All"
"Who Wants to Live Forever"
"Last Horizon"
"Guitar Solo"
"Tie Your Mother Down"
"The Show Must Go On"
"Bohemian Rhapsody"
"Radio Ga Ga"
Encore
"We Will Rock You"
"We Are The Champions"
"God Save the Queen (tape)"
Note:
In Lisbon "Radio Ga Ga" was played during the encore.
}}
{{hidden
| headercss = background: #ccccff; font-size: 100%; width: 75%;
| contentcss = text-align: left; font-size: 100%; width: 75%;
| header = Linz & Cologne
| content =
"One Vision"
"Hammer to Fall"
"Seven Seas of Rhye"
"Stone Cold Crazy"
"Fat Bottomed Girls"
"Play the Game"
"Killer Queen"
"I Want To Break Free"
"Somebody to Love"
"Love of My Life"
"These Are the Days of Our Lives"
"Drum Battle"
"Under Pressure"
"Crazy Little Thing Called Love"
"Don't Stop Me Now"
"Another One Bites The Dust"
"I Want It All"
"Who Wants to Live Forever"
"Last Horizon"
"Guitar Solo"
"Tie Your Mother Down"
"Bohemian Rhapsody"
"Radio Ga Ga"
Encore
"We Will Rock You"
"We Are The Champions"
"God Save the Queen (tape)"
}}
{{hidden
| headercss = background: #ccccff; font-size: 100%; width: 75%;
| contentcss = text-align: left; font-size: 100%; width: 75%;
| header = Jelling & Helsinki
| content =
"One Vision"
"Hammer to Fall"
"Seven Seas of Rhye"
"Stone Cold Crazy"
"Another One Bites The Dust"
"Fat Bottomed Girls"
"Play the Game"
"Killer Queen"
"Don't Stop Me Now"
"Somebody to Love"
"Love of My Life"
"These Are the Days of Our Lives"
"Drum Battle"
"Under Pressure"
"Crazy Little Thing Called Love"
"I Want To Break Free"
"I Want It All"
"Who Wants to Live Forever"
"Last Horizon"
"Guitar Solo"
"Tie Your Mother Down"
"Bohemian Rhapsody"
"Radio Ga Ga"
Encore
"We Will Rock You"
"We Are The Champions"
"God Save the Queen (tape)"
Note:
In Helsinki "Who Wants to Live Forever" was not performed.
}}
{{hidden
| headercss = background: #ccccff; font-size: 100%; width: 75%;
| contentcss = text-align: left; font-size: 100%; width: 75%;
| header = Tallinn & Sölvesborg
| content =
"One Vision"
"Hammer to Fall"
"Seven Seas of Rhye"
"Stone Cold Crazy"
"Another One Bites The Dust"
"Fat Bottomed Girls"
"Play the Game"
"Killer Queen"
"Don't Stop Me Now"
"Somebody to Love"
"Love of My Life"
"A Kind of Magic"
"Drum Battle"
"Under Pressure"
"Crazy Little Thing Called Love"
"I Want To Break Free"
"I Want It All"
"Last Horizon"
"Guitar Solo"
"Tie Your Mother Down"
"Bohemian Rhapsody"
"Radio Ga Ga"
Encore
"We Will Rock You"
"We Are The Champions"
"God Save the Queen (tape)"
}}
{{hidden
| headercss = background: #ccccff; font-size: 100%; width: 75%;
| contentcss = text-align: left; font-size: 100%; width: 75%;
| header = Newport & Brussels & Zurich & Oświęcim
| content =
"One Vision"
"Hammer to Fall"
"Seven Seas of Rhye"
"Stone Cold Crazy"
"Another One Bites The Dust"
"Fat Bottomed Girls"
"Play the Game"
"Killer Queen"
"Don't Stop Me Now"
"Somebody to Love"
"Love of My Life"
"A Kind of Magic"
"Drum Battle"
"Under Pressure"
"Crazy Little Thing Called Love"
"I Want To Break Free"
"I Want It All"
"Who Wants to Live Forever"
"Last Horizon"
"Guitar Solo"
"Tie Your Mother Down"
"Bohemian Rhapsody"
"Radio Ga Ga"
Encore
"We Will Rock You"
"We Are The Champions"
"God Save the Queen (tape)"
Note:
In Oświęcim "Drum Battle" was not played due to strong rain.
}}
{{hidden
| headercss = background: #ccccff; font-size: 100%; width: 75%;
| contentcss = text-align: left; font-size: 100%; width: 75%;
| header = Bucharest & Sofia & Padua
| content =
"Flash (tape)"
"The Hero"
"One Vision"
"Hammer to Fall"
"Seven Seas of Rhye"
"Stone Cold Crazy"
"Another One Bites The Dust"
"Fat Bottomed Girls"
"Play the Game"
"Killer Queen"
"Don't Stop Me Now"
"Somebody to Love"
"Love of My Life"
"A Kind of Magic"
"Drum Battle"
"Under Pressure"
"Crazy Little Thing Called Love"
"I Want To Break Free"
"I Want It All"
"Who Wants to Live Forever"
"Last Horizon"
"Guitar Solo"
"Tie Your Mother Down"
"Bohemian Rhapsody"
"Radio Ga Ga"
Encore
"We Will Rock You"
"We Are The Champions"
"God Save the Queen (tape)"
}}
{{hidden
| headercss = background: #ccccff; font-size: 100%; width: 75%;
| contentcss = text-align: left; font-size: 100%; width: 75%;
| header = Tel Aviv
| content =
"Seven Seas of Rhye" 
"Keep Yourself Alive" 
"Hammer to Fall" 
"Stone Cold Crazy"
"Fat Bottomed Girls"
"Don't Stop Me Now"
"Killer Queen" 
"Somebody to Love"
"Love of My Life"
"These Are the Days of Our Lives"
"Drum Battle"
"Under Pressure"
"Crazy Little Thing Called Love" 
"Dragon Attack 
"Another One Bites The Dust"
"I Want It All"
"Last Horizon"
"Guitar Solo"
"Who Wants to Live Forever"
"The Show Must Go On"
"Tie Your Mother Down"
"I Want To Break Free"
"Bohemian Rhapsody"
"Radio Ga Ga"
Encore
"We Will Rock You"
"We Are The Champions"
"God Save the Queen (tape)
}}
{{hidden
| headercss = background: #ccccff; font-size: 100%; width: 75%;
| contentcss = text-align: left; font-size: 100%; width: 75%;
| header = Singapore 
| content =
"Seven Seas of Rhye"
"Hammer to Fall" 
"Stone Cold Crazy"
"Fat Bottomed Girls"
"Don't Stop Me Now"
"Killer Queen" 
"Somebody to Love"
"Love of My Life"
"A Kind of Magic"
"Drum Battle"
"Under Pressure"
"Crazy Little Thing Called Love"
"Another One Bites The Dust"
"I Want It All"
"Last Horizon"
"Guitar Solo"
"Who Wants to Live Forever"
"The Show Must Go On"
"Tie Your Mother Down"
"I Want To Break Free"
"Bohemian Rhapsody"
"Radio Ga Ga"
Encore
"We Will Rock You"
<li value="24">"We Are The Champions"
<li value="25">"God Save the Queen (tape)
}}

Tour dates

Tour band

Brian May – electric and acoustic guitars, vocals 
Roger Taylor – drums, percussion, vocals 
Adam Lambert – lead vocals 
Freddie Mercury – vocals (pre-recorded)

Additional musicians: 
Spike Edney – keyboards, vocals
Neil Fairclough – bass guitars, vocals
Rufus Tiger Taylor – percussion, additional drums, vocals

Notes

References

External links
QueenOnline – Queen's official website
Adam Lambert – Adam Lambert's official website

2016 concert tours
Queen + Adam Lambert concert tours